Robert Patterson (born 8 March 1875, date of death unknown) was a South African sports shooter. He competed in five events at the 1912 Summer Olympics.

References

1875 births
Year of death missing
South African male sport shooters
Olympic shooters of South Africa
Shooters at the 1912 Summer Olympics
Scottish emigrants to South Africa
Place of birth missing